Catene (internationally released as Chains) is a 1949 Italian melodrama film directed by Raffaello Matarazzo. It had an impressive commercial success, being seen by 6 million people, one in eight Italians of the time, and was followed by a series of six other successful films directed by Matarazzo and featuring the couple Amedeo Nazzari and Yvonne Sanson.  The film was remade in 1974.

The film's sets were designed by the art director Ottavio Scotti. The film features in Cinema Paradiso.

Plot and outline
A husband kills his wife's ex-boyfriend, who was blackmailing her. He flees to America, but is sent back to Italy to stand trial. The only way he can be set free is if his wife confesses to adultery – so the murder can be considered a crime of passion – but this estranges her from her family. Starring Amedeo Nazzari and actress of Greek origin Yvonne Sanson. Maligned by critics because it did not conform to precepts of neorealism, this did not prevent its unexpected box office success.

Cast
Amedeo Nazzari: Guglielmo
Yvonne Sanson: Rosa
Aldo Nicodemi: Emilio
Teresa Franchini: Anna Aniello, mother of Guglielmo
Aldo Silvani: prosecutor
Roberto Murolo: emigrant
 Gianfranco Magalotti as Tonino Aniello
 Rosalia Randazzo as Angela Aniello 
 Nino Marchesini as L'avvocato difensore
 Lilly Marchi
 Amalia Pellegrini
 Giulio Tomasini

References

External links

1949 films
1949 drama films
Films directed by Raffaello Matarazzo
Italian drama films
1940s Italian-language films
Italian black-and-white films
1940s Italian films